Alok Chatterjee is an Indian theatre actor and director known for his theatre productions like Death of a Salesman ,Nat Samrat and #Anandmath  latest play 2022. He has been teaching at NSD and Pune based FTII. He also taught acting in the institute of Anupam Kher, Actor Prepress in Mumbai. At present, Chatterjee, in Madhya Pradesh Natya Vidyalaya, is known for his vast range of acting (teaching) with deep literary understanding. He is a gold medalist from the National School of Drama, Delhi for best acting. Chatterjee does theatre in his hometown of Bhopal.

Early life and education 
Alok Chatterjee was born in Madhya Pradesh, to a Hindu family. He earned a scholarship to study at National School of Drama (NSD) in New Delhi in 1987. Actor Irfan Khan and he was batchmate in National School of Drama (NSD). When he was in Mumbai  alcohol and some other chaos pushed them into oblivion. "It's hard to walk home In the words of Chatterjee who worshiped both times, Mahakal (Shiva), "It was the effect of fifty-seven years ago." (वह साढ़े साती का असर था)"

in an interview Manoj Bajpayee said about him: "I used to admire Alok Chatterjee a lot during my theatre days. He was Irrfan's classmate. I have learnt a lot from him and look up to him, but every person has his own destiny. He never ventured into Bollywood and at times, I feel bad about that since he is so talented."

– Manoj Bajpayee

Plays

Notable students 
Manav Kaul

References 

Living people
Indian male stage actors
Male actors from Madhya Pradesh
Year of birth missing (living people)
21st-century Indian male actors
Indian drama teachers
National School of Drama alumni
Recipients of the Sangeet Natak Akademi Award